Khalid Massad Al-Muwalid (born 23 November 1971) is a retired Saudi Arabian footballer. He played most of his career for Al Ahli and Al Ittihad.

Al-Muwallid played for the Saudi Arabia national football team and was a participant at the 1994 FIFA World Cup and at the 1998 FIFA World Cup.

International career

International goals
Scores and results list Saudi Arabia's goal tally first.

Championships 
With Al-Ahli Club:

 1998 Crown Prince Cup.

 Prince Faisal bin Fahd Cup 2001.

With Al Ittihad Club:

 Saudi League Championship 2001.

 Saudi-Egyptian Super Cup 2001.

 Saudi League Championship 2003.

International and individual achievements with the national team:

 Gulf Cup 12 in Bahrain.

 88th Asian Cup in Qatar.

 96th Asian Cup in the UAE.

 Participation in the 94th World Cup in America and 98th in France.

 3 participations in the Confederations Cup 1992, 1995, 1997 AD.

 He participated in the U-17 World Cup twice, the first in 1985 in China and the second in 1987 in Canada.

 Participation in the FIFA U-20 World Cup 1987 in Chile.

 1998 Arab Cup Championship.

individual achievements:
 Player of the season in Al-Ahli 1992.
 Best Arab player in 1992.
 Best player in the 1992 Arab Cup for National Teams.
 The third best Asian player in 1992/93.
 Participated in the Asian Stars team in 1993.
 Best Arab player in 1996.
 Best Gulf player in 1996.
 The national team's top scorer in the 98 World Cup qualifiers.
 Participated in the World Stars team in 2000.
 FIFA chose his goal in America in the 1992 Confederations Cup as one of the 13 best goals in the history of the tournament.
 He was chosen by the International Federation among the 10 best players of the decade in the continent of Asia (1990-2000).
 The most goals scored in the history of the Saudi national team midfielder (28 goals).

See also
 List of men's footballers with 100 or more international caps

References

External links

1971 births
Living people
Saudi Arabian footballers
Saudi Arabia international footballers
1992 King Fahd Cup players
1994 FIFA World Cup players
1995 King Fahd Cup players
1997 FIFA Confederations Cup players
1998 FIFA World Cup players
1988 AFC Asian Cup players
1992 AFC Asian Cup players
1996 AFC Asian Cup players
AFC Asian Cup-winning players
Al-Ahli Saudi FC players
Ittihad FC players
Footballers at the 1990 Asian Games
Sportspeople from Jeddah
FIFA Century Club
Association football midfielders
Saudi Professional League players
Asian Games competitors for Saudi Arabia